Slave to the Rhythm is the seventh studio album by Grace Jones, released on 28 October 1985 by Island Records. Subtitled a biography in the liner notes, Slave to the Rhythm is a concept album, produced by ZTT Records founder and producer Trevor Horn, that went on to become one of Jones' most commercially successful albums and spawned her biggest hit, "Slave to the Rhythm".

Background
After finishing sessions at Compass Point for her Living My Life album in late 1982, Jones took a break from recording music and focused on an acting career. Within two years, she made her debut as an actress in the 1984 film Conan the Destroyer, where she played alongside Arnold Schwarzenegger. She later appeared in the James Bond film A View to a Kill as the villain May Day. After finishing filming in late 1984 she returned to the studio to work on a follow-up, ending an almost three-year-long hiatus.

Slave to the Rhythm, both song and album, was written by Bruce Woolley, Simon Darlow, Stephen Lipson and Trevor Horn and was produced by Trevor Horn, who was assisted by Lipson. Unlike most albums that feature a collection of different songs, Slave to the Rhythm was a concept album that featured several, radical interpretations of one title track. The project was originally intended for Frankie Goes to Hollywood as a follow-up to their hit "Relax", but was finally given to Jones. The recording process featured Horn, Lipson and Jones creating a new version of the song every week or so, ballooning the budget for a single song to nearly $385,000 USD. As such, several versions were collected and released as the album proper.

Musically, Slave to the Rhythm ranges from funk to R&B, incorporating go-go beats throughout the album. All eight tracks are interspersed with excerpts from conversations with Jones about her life, conducted by journalists Paul Morley and Paul Cooke, hence the a biography subtitle. The album also contains voice-overs from actor Ian McShane reciting passages from Jean-Paul Goude's biography Jungle Fever. Though recording dates of each version of the song are unknown, "Operattack" was created with vocal samples from "Jones the Rhythm"; while "Don't Cry - It's Only the Rhythm" is a variation of the bridge that appears on "Slave to the Rhythm." Also, "The Fashion Show" could potentially be an early version of "Ladies and Gentlemen: Miss Grace Jones". "Ladies and Gentlemen" would be released as a single, under the title of "Slave to the Rhythm".

According to the album's sleeve notes, extensive use of the New England Digital Synclavier was made in its recording.

Slave to the Rhythm is one of the most successful of all Grace Jones' albums in terms of commercial performance. It performed best in German-speaking Europe and the Netherlands, where it secured top 10 placings. It also reached number 12 on the UK Albums Chart in November 1985. The album remains the second highest-charting album of Jones' on the US Billboard 200 (after Nightclubbing) and her only entry on the Canadian Albums Chart. As of December 1986, the album had sold 150,000 copies in the United States and one million worldwide.

Abridged version
Portions of the original LP material are absent on several CD reissues. "Jones the Rhythm", "The Fashion Show" and "Ladies and Gentlemen: Miss Grace Jones" are all edited in length (with the latter track matching the 7" single mix); and the interview portions between Morley and Jones are omitted, rendering "The Crossing" a fully instrumental track. "The Frog and the Princess" appears in extended form and is moved further down the running order, after "Slave to the Rhythm". Ian McShane's introduction from the start of the album, "Ladies and gentlemen: Miss Grace Jones", reappears as the intro to the song of the same name. Only the US CD, released in 1987 (Island 7-60460-2), and the 2015 remastered CD retain the same track listing and running times as the vinyl version.

Artwork
Designed by Jean-Paul Goude, Jones' partner at that time, the cover picture is a montage of several copies of a single photograph of Jones, that makes her hair look "extended" and her mouth "stretched". The process of its creation is illustrated in the title song's music video. The artwork has its roots in an earlier design of Goude's, the cover of Cristina's 1984 album Sleep It Off.

In 2008, the Slave to the Rhythm cover was included in Jason Draper's book A Brief History of Album Covers, which described it as "glass-shattering", reconfiguring the singer's image "as someone much more approachable and full of humour than previously thought."

Singles
Only two singles were released from the album. The first, "Slave to the Rhythm", was a major hit and has eventually become Jones' biggest chart success. As previously mentioned, this version of "Slave to the Rhythm" was released on the album Slave to the Rhythm under the name of "Ladies and Gentlemen: Miss Grace Jones". However, due to numerous performances, usage in the music video and the big commercial success, this version is now more often associated with the title "Slave to the Rhythm". The actual album track titled "Slave to the Rhythm", which is rendered on the packaging in capital letters, is entirely different and has been confused for the single version for some greatest hits albums.

"Jones the Rhythm", the second and the last single, was released at the end of the year, but passed unnoticed, overshadowed by the success of the first single and the release of the Island Life compilation. It had relatively little promotion and no music video was produced for it.

Track listing
Original UK/US vinyl & US CD, and 2015 remaster pressings

Abridged UK CD version

Personnel

 Ambrosian Singers – background vocals, choir, chorus
 Peter Banks - guitar - uncredited
 Guy Barker – trumpet
 Pete Beachill – trombone, trumpet
 J.J. Belle – guitar, percussion, bass, vocals, hi hat
 Dave Bishop – tenor saxophone
 Stuart Brook – trumpet
 David Gilmour – guitar samples
 Glenn Gregory – background vocals
 Jean-Paul Goude – design
 Trevor Horn – production
 Luís Jardim – percussion, bass guitar
 Grace Jones – lead vocals
 Stephen Lipson – guitar, bass, keyboards, engineering, synclavier, assisting production
 Andy Macintosh – tenor saxophone
 Gary Maughan – keyboards
 Nick Murdoch - keyboards
 John McCarthy – conductor, choir, chorus
 Ian McShane – voice-overs
 Andra Faye McIntosh – baritone saxophone

 Paul Morley – interview
 Paul Cooke – jovial interview
 Richard Niles – arrangements
 Tessa Niles – harp, background vocals
 The Little Beats – percussion
 Geoff Perkins – trombone
 John Pigneguy – French horn
 Andrew Richards – guitar, keyboards, background vocals
 Andy Richards – drums, keyboards
 Frank Ricotti – percussion, arrangements
 Jon Sinclair – keyboards
 David Snell – harp, French horn
 Stan Sulzmann – alto and tenor saxophone
 Jamie Talbot – alto saxophone
 John Thirkell – percussion, trumpet
 "Shorty" Tim Glover – percussion
 Phil Todd – alto saxophone
 Wallmen – keyboards
 Bruce Woolley – guitar, bass, keyboards, background vocals
 William "Ju Ju" House – drums

Charts

Weekly charts

Year-end charts

Certifications and sales

Release history

References

1985 albums
Albums produced by Trevor Horn
Concept albums
Go-go albums
Grace Jones albums
Island Records albums